Santa Catarina Loxicha is a town and municipality in Oaxaca in south-western Mexico. The municipality covers an area of  km². 
It is part of the Pochutla District in the east of the Costa Region

References

Municipalities of Oaxaca